St. Louise's Comprehensive College (Irish: Colaiste Naoimh Labhaoise) is a comprehensive high school located in the Upper Falls Road, Belfast.

History
St. Louise's was established in 1958.  The religious order the Daughters of Charity of St Vincent de Paul was asked by the Catholic Church to take responsibility for this school. The college is named after St. Louise de Marrilac who co-founded the Daughters of Charity with St. Vincent de Paul.

Sister Genevieve (Mary) O'Farrell was appointed one of the first Principals. She held the position for 25 years during which period the school grew in size from 1,000 to 2,400 students becoming the largest single-sex school in Europe. In 2019/20 school year it has begun to accept boys as well as girls.

Academics
St. Louise's offers instruction in a wide range of subjects. It offers technical and vocational courses alongside a large suite of academic subjects.

In 2006 it was recognised as one of the first Specialist Colleges in Northern Ireland with particular expertise in Performing Arts and Media.

In 2013 it was ranked the top, non-selective school in Northern Ireland at 5A* - C and has been the highest performing Belfast school for several years in a row.

At ‘A’Level, its value added scores have placed it in the top ten percent of schools across Britain for several years in succession. In 2019, 75.5% of its students who sat the A-level exams were awarded three A*-C grades.
It is one of the few schools in Northern Ireland which has City and Guilds affiliation.

Principals
 1958-1963 - Sister Ita
 1963-1988 - Sister Genevieve
 1988-2005 - Sister Rosaleen
 2005-2014 - Carmel McCartan
 2014-       Mary McHenry

Notable alumni
 Brenda Murphy (b. 1954) - playwright 
 Bronagh Taggart (b. 1961) - actor and writer 
 Geraldine Hughes (b. 1970) - actor
 Emma Jordan - actor and theatre director
 Mary O'Hara - journalist and writer 
 Anthony Boyle (b. 1994) - actor 
 Kristina O'Hara (born 1996) - boxer

See also
 List of secondary schools in Belfast

References

External links
St. Louise's Comprehensive College

Catholic secondary schools in Northern Ireland
Educational institutions established in 1958
Vincentian schools
1958 establishments in Northern Ireland
Specialist colleges in Northern Ireland